The Medal "For Merit in the Development of Atomic Energy" is a state decoration of the Russian Federation aimed at recognising achievements in the nuclear industry. It was established by presidential decree №133 on March 16, 2015, marking the 70th anniversary of the Russian nuclear industry. The decree also established the title "Honored Worker of the Nuclear Industry of the Russian Federation."

Award statute
The Medal "For Merit in the Development of Nuclear Energy" is awarded to citizens of the Russian Federation for achievements in the field of research, development, and use of nuclear energy, for contributions in nuclear safety and training, and for other achievements in the development of Russian atomic energy, defensive capabilities, national interests, and international cooperation. Foreign nationals may also receive the medal for contributions to the development of the nuclear industry of the Russian Federation.

The Russian Federation Order of Precedence dictates the Medal "For Merit in the Development of Nuclear Energy" is to be worn on the left breast with other medals immediately after the Medal For the Development of Railways.

Award description

The Medal "For Merit in the Development of Nuclear Energy" is a 32-millimetre-diameter silver-plated circular medal with raised rims on both the obverse and reverse.  The obverse bears the symbol of the atom, above images of a nuclear icebreaker, nuclear submarine, and nuclear power plant. On the reverse is the inscription "For Merit in the Development of Nuclear Energy", with the letters "№" and the award serial number in relief below the inscription.

The medal is suspended by a ring through the award's suspension loop to a standard Russian pentagonal mount covered with a silk moire ribbon measuring 24 mm in width. The ribbon is split into three equal stripes, a red one in the middle with bright blue on each side, and there are 1 mm white stripes between the stripes and along the ribbon edges.

There is also a ribbon version of the medal with a bar measuring 24 mm in width and 8 mm in height, with the same color scheme as the ribbon used on the medal itself.

See also

 Awards and decorations of the Russian Federation
 Kurchatov Medal: Russian nuclear physics award

References

External links
 The Commission on State Awards to the President of the Russian Federation

Civil awards and decorations of Russia
Russian awards
Awards established in 2015
Nuclear energy in Russia